Ali Kaan Güneren (born 8 April 2000) is a Turkish football player who plays as a midfielder for Samsunspor on loan from Ankaragücü.

Professional career
A youth product of Amasyaspor, Amasya Belediyespor, Akhisarspor, Güneren signed his first professional contract with Akhisarspor in November 2018. He made his professional debut with Akhisarspor in a 0-0 Süper Lig tie with Konyaspor on 25 May 2019. He transferred to Ankaragücü on 21 January 2021.

On 8 September 2022, Güneren joined Samsunspor on a season-long loan with an option to buy.

International career
Güneren made his debut for the Turkey U21s in a 1–0 2021 UEFA European Under-21 Championship qualification win over Andorra U21 on 9 September 2020.

References

External links
 
 
 Mackolik Profile

2000 births
Living people
People from Merzifon
Turkish footballers
Association football midfielders
Turkey under-21 international footballers
Akhisarspor footballers
MKE Ankaragücü footballers
Samsunspor footballers
Süper Lig players
TFF First League players